Royyuru is a village in Krishna District, Thotlavalluru Mandalam, Andhra Pradesh, India.

References 

Villages in Krishna district